The City of Cairns was a local government area centred on the Far North Queensland city of Cairns. Established in 1885, for most of its existence it consisted of approximately  around Cairns itself, with much of the metropolitan area being located in the Shire of Mulgrave. The Shire amalgamated into the City on 22 March 1995, as did small sections of neighbouring shires.

In 2008, the City amalgamated with the Shire of Douglas to become the Cairns Region.

History

Following a petition by local residents, on 28 May 1885, the Borough of Cairns was established under the Local Government Act 1878, being excised from the Cairns Division.

With the passage of the Local Authorities Act 1902, the Borough of Cairns became the Town of Cairns on 31 March 1903.

On 12 October 1923, the Town of Cairns was proclaimed City of Cairns.

On 21 November 1991, the Electoral and Administrative Review Commission, created two years earlier, produced its second report, and recommended that local government boundaries in the Cairns area be rationalised, and that the Shire of Mulgrave be dissolved and amalgamated with the City of Cairns. The Shire at that stage had a population of 54,783 (1991) while the City had 49,361. Both authorities had chambers in the Cairns CBD. The old City Council chambers were located on Abbott Street, and have since been converted into a city library. The old Mulgrave Shire Chambers were located on Cairns Esplanade.

The Local Government (Cairns, Douglas, Mareeba and Mulgrave) Regulation 1994 was gazetted on 16 December 1994, additionally mandating that small sections of the Shire of Mareeba around Redlynch and Barron Gorge and Ellis Beach in the Shire of Douglas also be amalgamated. It further specified that the new Council would have an elected mayor and 12 councillors each representing one of 12 divisions.

On 22 March 1995, the new City came into existence, and Tom Pyne, previously the Chairman of the Mulgrave shire council, was elected as its first mayor. He retired in 2000, and Kevin Byrne of the Cairns Unity grouping served two full terms until the council's dissolution in 2008. In a controversial decision, new council chambers were constructed on previously industrial contaminated land in the mainly industrial suburb of Portsmith.

On 15 March 2008, under the Local Government (Reform Implementation) Act 2007 passed by the Parliament of Queensland on 10 August 2007, the City of Cairns merged with the Shire of Douglas to form the Cairns Region. Byrne was narrowly defeated by Val Schier of Cairns 1st for the mayoralty of the new Regional Council.

In 2012, a proposal was made to de-amalgamate the Shire of Douglas from the Cairns Region. On 6 December 2012, the Queensland Minister for Local Government, the Hon. David Crisafulli, granted the people of the former Douglas Shire a vote on possible de-amalgamation from the Cairns Regional Council, even though the Queensland Treasury Corporation had calculated the costs to be too high a burden on the few ratepayers of this small shire, and the shire to be unviable in the long term. Despite strong opposition from many parties, on 9 March 2013 the citizens of the former Douglas shire voted in a referendum to de-amalgamate. As of 1 January 2014 Douglas Shire is no longer part of the Cairns Regional Council.

Suburbs and localities
The City of Cairns included the following settlements:

Cairns Central area:
 Aeroglen
 Bungalow
 Cairns City
 Cairns North
 Earlville
 Edge Hill
 Kanimbla
 Manoora
 Manunda
 Mooroobool
 Parramatta Park
 Portsmith
 Westcourt
 Whitfield

Northern Mulgrave area:
 Barron
 Barron Gorge
 Brinsmead
 Buchan Point
 Caravonica
 Clifton Beach
 Ellis Beach
 Freshwater
 Holloways Beach
 Kamerunga
 Kewarra Beach
 Lamb Range
 Macalister Range
 Machans Beach
 Palm Cove
 Redlynch
 Smithfield
 Stratford
 Trinity Beach
 Trinity Park
 Yorkeys Knob

Southern Mulgrave area:
 Aloomba
 Babinda
 Bartle Frere
 Bayview Heights
 Bellenden Ker
 Bentley Park
 Bramston Beach
 Deeral
 East Russell
 East Trinity
 Edmonton
 Eubenangee1
 Fishery Falls
 Fitzroy Island
 Glen Boughton
 Goldsborough

 Gordonvale
 Green Hill
 Green Island
 Kamma
 Little Mulgrave
 Meringa
 Miriwinni
 Mount Peter
 Mount Sheridan
 Ngatjan1
 Packers Camp
 Waugh Pocket
 White Rock2
 Woopen Creek
 Wooroonooran3
 Woree
 Wrights Creek

1 - shared with Cassowary Coast Region
2 - not to be confused with White Rock in City of Ipswich
3 - shared with shared with Cassowary Coast Region and Tablelands Region

Population

Mayors

References

External links
 Local Government (Cairns, Douglas, Mareeba and Mulgrave) Regulation 1994
  

Cairns, Queensland
Former local government areas of Queensland
Far North Queensland
1885 establishments in Australia
2008 disestablishments in Australia
Populated places disestablished in 2008